Wasteland is a Czech television series, which premiered in October 2016 on HBO Europe. She loses a referendum allowing the mine to expand, in contravention of a 1991 law limiting brown coal mining in North Bohemia. At the same time, her daughter disappears, and what appears to be an attempt to silence her opposition to the coal mines suggests even deeper layers of political intrigue.

Filming locations include Jezeří Chateau, an historic site almost entirely surrounded by surface mines. 

The cast also includes Jaroslav Dušek, Eva Holubová and Petra Špalková.  Ivan Zachariáš, the Czech-born director, chose to cast amateurs alongside the professional actors, in order to heighten the eight-part series' realism. 

The first two episodes of the series had an advance screening at the Karlovy Vary International Film Festival in July 2016, and in the Primetime program at the 2016 Toronto International Film Festival.

Cast
Zuzana Stivínová jr. as Mayor Hana Sikorová, Míša's mother
Jaroslav Dušek as Karel Sikora, Hana's ex-husband and father of Míša
Eliška Křenková as Klára Sikorová, Míša's sister
Leoš Noha as Kpt. Václav Rajner, investigator
Jan Cina as Lukáš „Šary“ Vašíček, Klára's boyfriend
Štěpán Benoni as Adam Vašíček
Oskar Hes as Filip Paskowski
Eva Holubová as Vašíčková
Miroslav Vladyka as Vašíček
Martin Sitta as Pavel Abrham
Petra Špalková as Markéta Masařová
Štěpán Matejíčka as Jakub Masař
Kateřina Pindejová as Abramová
Martin Kubačák as František Cetkovský
Ivan Krúpa as Petr Krušina
Adam Petrlík as Dejv
Janek Gregor as Tibor Balog
Jan Bavala as Sysel
Mário Pech as Horváth
Maxmilián Mráz as Kučera
Richard Stanke as Kwiatkowski
Adrian Jastraban as Filip's father

Awards 

 Trilobit 2017
 Czech Lion Awards 2017
 Czech Film Critics' Awards 2017

References

External links
 

Czech drama television series
2016 Czech television series debuts
Czech Lion Awards winners (television series)
Czech Film Critics' Awards winners
HBO Europe original programming
Czech-language HBO original programming